U Geminorum (U Gem), in the constellation Gemini, is an archetypal example of a dwarf nova. The binary star system consists of a white dwarf closely orbiting a red dwarf. Every few months it undergoes an outburst that greatly increases its brightness.  The dwarf nova class of variable stars are often referred to as U Geminorum variables after this star.

Discovery
U Geminorum was discovered by J.R. Hind in 1855 who initially thought it was a nova; it quickly faded below his telescope's limiting magnitude.  Its true nature was revealed three months later when it was re-observed in outburst by Pogson.  The star has been monitored by amateur and professional astronomers ever since, though its location near the zodiac means that some outbursts are undoubtedly missed due to the seasonal gap.

Orbit
The U Geminorum binary has a very short orbital period of 4 hours and 11 minutes; this orbit alone makes the system variable, as the components transit and eclipse each other with each revolution. Normally, the combined apparent magnitude varies between 14.0 and 15.1; during an outburst however, the star can brighten a hundredfold, to above 9th magnitude. Though the average interval between outbursts is 102 days, the period is in fact highly irregular, varying from as little as 62 days to as long as 257.  As is the case with dwarf novae, the outbursts are theorized results of a periodic surge of influx from the white dwarf's accretion disk, caused by instability in the disk itself.

The orbital motion of the two stars causes their spectral lines to shift due to the doppler effect.  However, the wavelengths of the white dwarf spectral lines are also changed due to its gravitational redshift.  This complicates the derivation of an accurate orbit.  The properties of the stars implied by their orbit are somewhat different from those directly observed or typical for stars of their type.

Distance

See also
Cataclysmic variable star

References

Further reading
Burnham, Robert.  Burnham's Celestial Handbook.  New York:  Dover Publications, Inc., 1978.    pp. 925–34.

External links
 AAVSO comparison charts suitable for bright and faint states
 AAVSO: U Gem: February 1999 Variable Star of the Month
 IR spectral data for redshift calculations
 AAVSO: Quick Look View of AAVSO Observations (get recent magnitude estimates for U Gem)

M-type main-sequence stars
Dwarf novae
Gemini (constellation)
Geminorum, U
064511
Durchmusterung objects
Emission-line stars